Jarrhan Jacky is an Australian rules football player who played for the Adelaide Crows in the Australian Football League (AFL).

Recruited from Western Australian Football League (WAFL) club Subiaco at the 2007 AFL Draft, Jacky made his AFL debut against Fremantle in round five 2008, kicked his first AFL goal in his second game, against North Melbourne.

When not picked by Adelaide, Jacky played with South Australian Football League (SANFL) club Woodville-West Torrens.

References

External links

Adelaide Football Club players
Indigenous Australian players of Australian rules football
Subiaco Football Club players
Woodville-West Torrens Football Club players
Living people
1989 births
Australian rules footballers from Western Australia
People from the Kimberley (Western Australia)